Petra Krol is a former East German slalom canoeist who competed in the 1970s. She won three silver medals at the ICF Canoe Slalom World Championships, earning them in 1975 (K-1 team) and 1977 (K-1, K-1 team).

References

East German female canoeists
Living people
Year of birth missing (living people)
Medalists at the ICF Canoe Slalom World Championships